Xanthomarina gelatinilytica is a Gram-negative, rod-shaped, non-spore-forming and non-motile bacterium from the genus of Xanthomarina which has been isolated from seawater from Kōchi City.

References

Flavobacteria
Bacteria described in 2015